Jess D. Tinsley (October 18, 1908 – March 4, 1955) was an American football tackle in the National Football League (NFL). A native of Homer, Louisiana, Tinsley played college football at Louisiana State University for the LSU Tigers, where he was selected All-Southern. Jess was selected second-team for LSU's All-Time football team in 1935. It claimed he "turned into a master tackle in senior year." Jess was the cousin of future LSU football star Gaynell Tinsley.

In the NFL, he played for the Chicago Cardinals. He also played in the early American Football League for the Louisville Bourbons. Despite the AFL’s existing for only one season, it had two All-League teams, one selected by Associated Press writers in the cities represented by the AFL teams and one selected by the coaches of the American Football League. Tinsley made the AP Team.

References

1908 births
1955 deaths
Chicago Cardinals players
American football tackles
LSU Tigers football players
Players of American football from Louisiana
American football ends
All-Southern college football players
People from Homer, Louisiana